Buana Lakhu is a village located in the tehsil Israna of the Panipat district in the state of Haryana in India. It belongs to the Rohtak division.

References

Villages in Panipat district